The KFA Awards is an annual award ceremony hosted by Korea Football Association.

Player of the Year

KASA Best Footballer (1957–1972) 
The KFA recommended the best Korean footballer of the year who would be awarded a citation by the Korea Amateur Sports Association. (KASA)

Most Valuable Player (1965–1991) 
South Korean journalists selected the best players from 1969 to 1988 under the KFA. The KFA also chose the best players in some other years by itself.

Fans' Player of the Year (2003–2015) 
The KFA held an annual poll to select Korean fans' best player in its website.

Player of the Year (2010–present) 
The KFA members and South Korean journalists voted for the best Korean player of the year.

Women's Player of the Year

Young Player of the Year

Coach of the Year

Goal of the Year 
The KFA held an annual poll to select Korean fans' best goal in its website.

Hall of Fame

Player

Officer

Best XI (1969–1988) 
South Korean journalists selected the best eleven annually from 1969 to 1988 under the KFA.
Players marked bold won the Player of the Year award in that respective year.

See also 
Korea Football Association

Reference

External links

KFA trophies and awards